XHVI-FM is a radio station in San Juan del Río, Querétaro, broadcasting on 99.1 MHz. XHVI carries the Exa FM CHR format from MVS Radio and is owned by Multimedios en Radiodifusión Morales, S.A. de C.V.

History
XEVI-AM came to air on 1310 kHz in 1962 as the first radio station to be based in San Juan del Río. Initially known as "La Estación del Pueblo", it was owned by General Ramón Rodríguez Familiar, the governor of Querétaro from 1935 to 1939 and founder of Querétaro radio stations XEJX (now XHJX-FM) and XENA (now XHNAQ-FM) and founded by Enrique Morales García. By the late 1960s, XEVI had moved to 1400.

In the 1990s, the station came under the control of Martha Resendiz Osejo and became an FM combo; it was transferred to the current concessionaire, a business of the Morales Resendiz family, in 2009.

On October 3, 2017, XEVI formally surrendered its AM frequency, becoming an FM-only station.

References

Radio stations in Querétaro
Radio stations established in 1962
1962 establishments in Mexico